In mathematics, the Fekete–Szegő inequality is an inequality for the coefficients of univalent analytic functions found by , related to the Bieberbach conjecture. Finding similar estimates for other classes of functions is called the Fekete–Szegő problem.

The Fekete–Szegő inequality states that if

References

Inequalities